Ruth McNair  has been a driving force behind the improvement of lesbian and bisexual women's health and wellbeing in Australia.

Education 
Ruth McNair obtained diplomas of obstetrics and gynaecology, and anaesthetics in the UK, and has a Fellowship from the Royal Australian College of General Practitioners. She completed a PhD in lesbian and bisexual women's health in 2009.

Career 
In 2009 Ruth helped to establish Northside Clinic in Melbourne's inner north, which specialises in providing medical care for the gay, lesbian, bisexual, trans and HIV-positive communities.

Academic career 
Ruth is an Honorary Associate Professor in the Department of General Practice at the University of Melbourne, teaching and conducting LGBTI communities research.

Involvement in LGBTI communities 
McNair is active in LGBTI policy and community development, including roles as member and chairperson on each of the Victorian Ministerial Advisory Committees on Gay, Lesbian, Bisexual, Transgender and Intersex Health and Wellbeing since 2000. She was also was a member of the Health & Human Services Working Group, a working group of the Victorian Government's LGBTI Taskforce.

Honours 
To commemorate International Women's Day each year, the Victorian Government inducts 25 inspirational Victorian women into the Victorian Honour Roll of Women. McNair was inducted in 2017.

She was appointed a Member of the Order of Australia (AM) in the 2019 Queen's Birthday Honours in recognition of her "significant service to medicine, and as an advocate for the LGBTIQ community".

References

Australian obstetricians
Australian health activists
Living people
Year of birth missing (living people)
Members of the Order of Australia